Angelina Nicole Hix (born July 27, 1993) is an American soccer player who plays as a striker for Tijuana.

Career
Hix played soccer for the MiraCosta Spartans in 2011 and 2013, recording 52 goals and 27 assists and serving as team captain in her second season. She also played basketball for the school in the 2011–12 and 2012–13 seasons. Hix was scouted by scouted by several universities for soccer, and was offered multiple scholarships in soccer and basketball to play in college. She was offered a full athletic scholarship to play for the Cal State Dominguez Hills Toros, but ultimately did not join the team.

Hix played for the San Diego WFC SeaLions in 2015 and 2017, while playing for Tijuana Xolos USA in 2016. She played for LA Galaxy OC of United Women's Soccer in 2018. In mid 2018, Hix signed for Serbian side Spartak Subotica, but tore her ACL, MCL, and meniscus during a match in October 2018. Before the 2021 season, she signed for Santiago Morning in Chile. In 2021, she signed for Mexican club Tijuana.

Personal life
Hix was born in Irvine, California, and grew up in nearby Huntington Beach. She competed in surfing contests in her youth, and was sponsored by a surf shop. As a result, she was homeschooled for a few years to allow her to finish schoolwork early and go surfing daily. She was a graduate of Dehesa Charter School.

References

External links
 Angelina Hix at playmakerstats.com
 
 
 

1993 births
Living people
Soccer players from California
Sportspeople from Irvine, California
American expatriate sportspeople in Chile
American expatriate sportspeople in Mexico
American expatriate sportspeople in Serbia
American expatriate women's soccer players
American women's soccer players
Club Tijuana (women) footballers
Expatriate women's footballers in Chile
Expatriate women's footballers in Mexico
Expatriate women's footballers in Serbia
Liga MX Femenil players
Santiago Morning (women) footballers
Women's association football forwards
Women's Premier Soccer League players
United Women's Soccer players
ŽFK Spartak Subotica players